There are least 79 named Pillars in Wyoming according to the U.S. Geological Survey, U.S. Board of Geological Names. A Pillar is defined as a "vertical, standing, often spire-shaped, natural rock formation (chimney, monument, pinnacle, pohaku, rock tower)". The Oxford Dictionary of Geography defines Earth Pillar as "an upstanding, free column of soil that has been sheltered from erosion by a natural cap of stone on the top". They are common where boulder-rich moraines have been subject to gully erosion, as in parts of the southern Tyrol.

 Ames Monument, Albany County, Wyoming, el. 
 Anvil Rock, Park County, Wyoming, el. 
 Batchelder Column, Teton County, Wyoming, el. 
 Block Tower, Fremont County, Wyoming, el. 
 Bosin Rock, Sheridan County, Wyoming, el. 
 Camel Rock, Park County, Wyoming, el. 
 Castle Rock, Sweetwater County, Wyoming, el. 
 Castle Rock, Niobrara County, Wyoming, el. 
 Castle Rock, Johnson County, Wyoming, el. 
 Castle Rock, Fremont County, Wyoming, el. 
 Castle Rocks, Hot Springs County, Wyoming, el. 
 Chimney Rock, Platte County, Wyoming, el. 
 Chimney Rock, Fremont County, Wyoming, el. 
 Chimney Rock, Park County, Wyoming, el. 
 Chimney Rock, Fremont County, Wyoming, el. 
 Chimney Rock, Fremont County, Wyoming, el. 
 Chimney Rock, Big Horn County, Wyoming, el. 
 Chimney Rock, Big Horn County, Wyoming, el. 
 Devils Monument, Natrona County, Wyoming, el. 
 Dome Rock, Sheridan County, Wyoming, el. 
 Duck Rock, Park County, Wyoming, el. 
 Eagle Rock, Sweetwater County, Wyoming, el. 
 Eagle Rock, Big Horn County, Wyoming, el. 
 Eagle Rock, Albany County, Wyoming, el. 
 Elephant Head Rock, Park County, Wyoming, el. 
 Finger Rock, Johnson County, Wyoming, el. 
 Frank N Hammitt Monument, Park County, Wyoming, el. 
 French Rocks, Natrona County, Wyoming, el. 
 Giants Thumb, Sweetwater County, Wyoming, el. 
 Glen Rock, Converse County, Wyoming, el. 
 Goose Rock, Park County, Wyoming, el. 
 Gooseneck Pinnacle, Fremont County, Wyoming, el. 
 Gray Rocks, Albany County, Wyoming, el. 
 Hanging Rock, Park County, Wyoming, el. 
 Hat Rock, Niobrara County, Wyoming, el. 
 Henry Ford Rock, Park County, Wyoming, el. 
 Horse Tooth, Platte County, Wyoming, el. 
 Ice Point, Teton County, Wyoming, el. 
 Lamburger Rock, Sheridan County, Wyoming, el. 
 Laughing Pig Rock, Park County, Wyoming, el. 
 Leigh Monument, Washakie County, Wyoming, el. 
 Little Monument, Sweetwater County, Wyoming, el. 
 Monumental City, Crook County, Wyoming, el. 
 Neil Bell Monument, Natrona County, Wyoming, el. 
 Ninemile Rock, Goshen County, Wyoming, el. 
 North Chimney Rock, Sweetwater County, Wyoming, el. 
 Old Woman Cabin Rock, Park County, Wyoming, el. 
 Overhanging Tower, Sublette County, Wyoming, el. 
 Pinnacle Rocks, Niobrara County, Wyoming, el. 
 Preacher Rock, Sheridan County, Wyoming, el. 
 Red Bill Point, Goshen County, Wyoming, el. 
 Red Monument, Carbon County, Wyoming, el. 
 Red Rock, Park County, Wyoming, el. 
 Rock of Ages, Teton County, Wyoming, el. 
 Ship Rock, Niobrara County, Wyoming, el. 
 Slick Rock, Converse County, Wyoming, el. 
 Slipper Rock, Park County, Wyoming, el. 
 South Chimney Rock, Sweetwater County, Wyoming, el. 
 Steamboat Rock, Goshen County, Wyoming, el. 
 Steamboat Rock, Niobrara County, Wyoming, el. 
 Steamship Rock, Big Horn County, Wyoming, el. 
 Storm Point, Teton County, Wyoming, el. 
 Sugar Bowl Rock, Sweetwater County, Wyoming, el. 
 Symmetry Spire, Teton County, Wyoming, el. 
 Teakettle Rock, Sweetwater County, Wyoming, el. 
 Teepe Pillar, Teton County, Wyoming, el. 
 The Chimney, Johnson County, Wyoming, el. 
 The Holy City, Hot Springs County, Wyoming, el. 
 The Hoodoos, Park County, Wyoming, el. 
 The Needle, Park County, Wyoming, el. 
 The Open Door, Teton County, Wyoming, el. 
 The Pinnacles, Sweetwater County, Wyoming, el. 
 The Reefs, Natrona County, Wyoming, el. 
 Tie Hack Historical Monument, Fremont County, Wyoming, el. 
 Tollgate Rock, Sweetwater County, Wyoming, el. 
 Twin Rocks, Sweetwater County, Wyoming, el. 
 Wags Pinnacle, Campbell County, Wyoming, el. 
 Washakie Needles, Hot Springs County, Wyoming, el. 
 Watch Tower, Fremont County, Wyoming, el.

Notes

Lists of landforms of Wyoming